Warrington Stone Bridge was a bridge in the Columbia section of Knowlton Township, Warren County, New Jersey, United States. The bridge was built in 1850 and added to the National Register of Historic Places on December 16, 1977.

See also
National Register of Historic Places listings in Warren County, New Jersey

References

Bridges completed in 1850
Road bridges on the National Register of Historic Places in New Jersey
Bridges in Warren County, New Jersey
Knowlton Township, New Jersey
National Register of Historic Places in Warren County, New Jersey
New Jersey Register of Historic Places
Stone arch bridges in the United States